The Mode class or Mjölner class was a class of four coastal destroyers commissioned by the Royal Swedish Navy during World War II. The design was based on the preceding  purchased from Italy but with Swedish equipment and armament. The destroyers served as coastal escorts. The class was moderately upgraded and reclassified as frigates during the early part of the Cold War. After nearly thirty years of service, the last vessel was retired in 1970.

Background
Italy also provided the blueprints for a more modern version of Psilander, which was used by the designers at Götaverken in Gothenburg as the basis to develop a new light destroyer. Götaverken also built the first two vessels of the class of four ships.

Design and development

Design
The destroyers have been described as, "more an expression of standardization, simplicity and simple building methods than carefully planned men of war." Displacement was  normal and  full load, beam  and draught . The bridge was wider than the superstructure, giving the vessels a distinctive appearance from the prow compared to other Swedish destroyers.

Machinery consisted of two Penhoët A oil-fired boilers, which supplied steam to two de Laval geared steam turbines, each driving its own propeller. A crew of 100 officers and ratings was carried.

Armament
Weaponry was manufactured in Sweden. The main armament consisted of three  K/50 M42 guns produced by Bofors. These were placed in separate mounts, one on the fore deck, one on the aft deck and one on the aft superstructure. Air defence consisted two  K/60 M36 and two  K/66 M40 individually mounted anti-aircraft autocannons, also provided by Bofors.

Three torpedo tubes for  torpedoes were triple mounted aft of the superstructure and two depth charge throwers were mounted further towards the stern. 42 mines could also be carried for minelaying.

Name
The class is known both as the Mode class, after the first vessel ordered, and the Mjölner class, after the first vessel launched. The vessels were named after characters and objects in Norse mythology, Mode and Magne, the sons of Thor, his hammer Mjölnir and Munin, one of the ravens that serve Odin.

Ships

Service

The four destroyers of the class were launched in 1942 and entered service in the Royal Swedish Navy. They operated in the escort role. During World War II, they served as part of the Swedish coastal fleet enforcing the country's neutrality but suffered no loss. Following the war, they escorted major warships like the anti-aircraft cruiser  on goodwill visits to countries like Belgium, Ireland and France.

Modernisation
The class were modernised between 1954 and 1955 and re-rated as frigates. One of the  main guns was removed, along with the triple  torpedo tube mount.  A single Squid depth charge launcher was fitted to improve anti-submarine capabilities and the  guns were upgraded. The class remained in service in this capacity until decommissioning.

References

Citations

Bibliography
 
 
 
 
 
 
 
 

 

Destroyer classes
Destroyers of the Swedish Navy
 
World War II destroyers